Winnersh railway station, previously known as Sindlesham and Hurst Halt and then Winnersh Halt, is a railway station located in the centre of the village of Winnersh in Berkshire, England.

History
The South Eastern and Chatham Railway opened the station on 1 January 1910 as Sindlesham and Hurst Halt. At the time the station was located in open countryside, and (as the name suggests) was intended to serve the nearby villages of Sindlesham ( to the south) and Hurst ( to the north). Following the opening of the station, the village of Winnersh developed around it and on 6 July 1930 the Southern Railway, which had taken over the line in the 1923 Grouping, renamed the station to Winnersh Halt. Finally British Railways shortened this to Winnersh on 5 May 1969.

In 1987 British Railways replaced the wooden station buildings on the platforms with new ones repositioned at the level of the road bridge that carries the B3030 over the line. In 2002 Railtrack extended the London-bound platform to accommodate eight-car Reading-Waterloo trains, just before South West Trains introduced Class 458 trains to the route. Until then, when the slam-door stock that they replaced was still in service, passengers wishing to leave the train at Winnersh were advised to move down the train in order to alight.

Facilities
The station has two side platforms, each of which has a separate ramped access down from the road overbridge carrying the B3030 over the line. The station building is situated at street level, alongside the entrance to the Reading bound platform. Access between the station building and London-bound platform, and between platforms, is via a  walk on the street.

The station building includes a ticket office, but it is currently staffed only on Monday to Saturday mornings. On Sundays the station is open but the booking office is closed. There is also a self-service ticket machine outside the station building. Access to the platforms is via ramps, which may be too steep for wheelchair usage.

Services

References

Bibliography

External links

Railway stations in Berkshire
DfT Category D stations
Former South Eastern Railway (UK) stations
Railway stations in Great Britain opened in 1910
Railway stations served by Great Western Railway
Railway stations served by South Western Railway